Michael Miller Horvit (born June 22, 1932, in Brooklyn, New York) is an American composer. Horvit trained at Yale University and Boston University and studied with Aaron Copland, Lukas Foss and Walter Piston, as well as Quincy Porter and Gardner Read. He was a professor of music theory and composition on the faculty of the Moores School of Music at the University of Houston.

He is coauthor, with Thomas Benjamin and Robert Nelson, of Techniques and Materials of Music (2003/2008). Thomson Schirmer. 7th edition. .

Selected works
Aleinu (Adoration)
Concerto for Brass Quintet and Orchestra
Concerto for Percussion
Fantasy for Violin and Orchestra, 'Daughters of Jerusalem'
Invocation and Exultation
Ohiloa la'el
The Cullen Overture

Recordings
Horvit: The Cullen Overture and other works Albany 2000

References

1932 births
Living people
Albany Records artists